Gianluca Nijholt (born 14 February 1990) is a Dutch former professional footballer who played as a midfielder. He played for FC Utrecht, Almere City, FC Amkar Perm, VVV-Venlo and NAC Breda.

Personal
His father is ex-player Luc Nijholt.

External links
 
Voetbal International

References

Living people
1990 births
Footballers from Utrecht (city)
Association football midfielders
Dutch footballers
Netherlands under-21 international footballers
Eredivisie players
Eerste Divisie players
FC Utrecht players
Almere City FC players
VVV-Venlo players
NAC Breda players
FC Amkar Perm players
Russian Premier League players
Dutch expatriate footballers
Expatriate footballers in Russia
Dutch expatriate sportspeople in Russia